The Brand–Nalder Ministry was the 24th Ministry of the Government of Western Australia, led by Liberal Premier David Brand and his deputy, Country Party leader Crawford Nalder. It succeeded the Brand–Watts Ministry on 1 February 1962 following the Deputy Premier's retirement from politics. The ministry was followed by the Tonkin Ministry on 3 March 1971 after the Coalition lost government at the state election held on 23 February.

First Ministry

On 1 February 1962, the Governor, Sir Charles Gairdner, constituted the Ministry. He designated 10 principal executive offices of the Government and appointed the following ministers to their positions, who served until the reconstitution of the Ministry after the 1965 state election.

The list below is ordered by decreasing seniority within the Cabinet, as indicated by the Government Gazette and the Hansard index. Blue entries indicate members of the Liberal Party, whilst green entries indicate members of the National Country Party. The members of the Ministry were:

Second Ministry

On 16 March 1965, the Governor, Major-General Sir Douglas Kendrew, constituted the Ministry. He designated 10 principal executive offices of the Government and appointed the following ministers to their positions, who served until the end of the Ministry. Two honorary ministers were also appointed; following the passage of the Constitution Acts Amendment Act 1965 (No.2 of 1965) on 13 August 1965, the ministry grew to include 12 members and the two honorary ministers, Ray O'Connor and Graham MacKinnon, were brought into the Ministry.

References

Brand 2
Ministries of Elizabeth II